Lanzante Limited is a British automotive company specializing in service and restoration of classic cars, while also participating in auto racing in both modern and historic guises under the Lanzante Motorsport title.  Founded by Paul Lanzante in the 1970s, the company is now led by his son Dean Lanzante out of their workshops in Petersfield, Hampshire, England.  Lanzante Motorsport won the 1995 24 Hours of Le Mans with a McLaren F1 GTR for McLaren Automotive under the name of Kokusai Kaihatsu Racing, leading to Lanzante becoming a service center for road and race McLarens.

Motorsport history
Following years of participation in historic motorsport, Lanzante moved to modern racing by entering the BPR Global GT Series in 1995 with a Porsche 911 Turbo competing in the GT3 category with drivers Paul Burdell, Wido Rössler, and Soames Langton.  In the same year, the McLaren F1 GTR was debuting in BPR, as well as entering the 24 Hours of Le Mans.  McLaren's developmental car was loaned to an entry backed by sponsors Kokusai Kaihatsu UK, while Lanzante was chosen to organize and run the team, which incorporated a small number of McLaren employees, other McLaren associates and experienced endurance engineers. Drivers for the effort were JJ Lehto, Masanori Sekiya, and Yannick Dalmas. Lanzante's McLaren was the fastest from the manufacturer in qualifying, and inherited the race lead after other McLarens suffered woes. The Kokusai Kaihatsu McLaren went on to win the 24 Hours of Le Mans by a one lap margin, making the McLaren the first car and Lanzante the first team to win on debut at Le Mans. In addition Lehto and Sekiya's involvement meant it was the first Le Mans win for a Finnish driver and a Japanese driver. Following Lanzante's Le Mans victory, their McLaren was returned and the team remained with Porsche throughout the rest of 1995.

In 1996 Lanzante purchased their own McLaren GTR for use in the British GT Championship, as well as a Porsche 911 GT2 for BPR.  The Porsche was also entered for Le Mans, but an invitation to partake in the race was not granted.  Langton and Burdell remained in the Porsche, joined by Stanley Dickens and earned several podiums over the season, but Soames Langton suffered life-threatening injuries at the Nogaro round when the Lanzante Porsche crashed.  In British GT the team's McLaren was driven by Ian Flux and James Ulrich, and won a race at Donington Park.  Although Flux and Ulrich lost the overall championship title to the drivers from Marcos, they did secure the title in the GT1 category.

Lanzante did not return to modern motorsport again until 2003 when the company developed a Lotus Elise for British GT, with Dean Lanzante taking over driving duties.  The Elise was later developed for the Britcar series, with Formula 1 designer Adrian Newey sharing driving duties.  Since 2015, Lanzante has been responsible for the road conversions of the McLaren P1 GTR, previously a track-only car.

McLaren P1 LM

With the production run of McLaren P1 GTRs having been built and sold, and prompted by their efforts in converting track-only spec P1 GTRs to road-legal spec variants, Lanzante Motorsport commissioned McLaren Special Operations' Bespoke division to build a further 6 new P1 GTRs for them to develop into road-legal P1 LM variants. Of this production run, five P1 LMs have been sold and the other P1 LM, the prototype which is designated XP1 LM, has been retained and is being used for development and testing. To make them into P1 LM spec, Lanzante Motorsport developed these P1 GTRs by, amongst other modifications, making changes to the drivetrain hardware (to increase power), by employing a modified rear wing and larger front splitter and dive planes (to improve downforce) and by removing the air-jack system and using Inconel catalytic converter pipes and exhaust headers, lightweight fabricated charge coolers, Lexan windows, lighter seats (from the F1 GTR) and titanium exhausts, bolts and fixings (to save weight).

At the 2016 Goodwood Festival of Speed, the prototype P1 LM, XP1 LM, set the fastest ever time for a road car up the Goodwood hillclimb, with a time of 47.07 seconds, driven by Kenny Bräck.

On 27 April 2017, the prototype P1 LM, XP1 LM, continued its success on track, beating the road car lap record time at the Nürburgring Nordschleife, with a time of 6:43.22 using road legal Pirelli P Zero Trofeo R tyres but without front number plate required to be road legal. This time was once again set by Kenny Bräck, and announced on 26 May 2017.

External links 

 

British auto racing teams
24 Hours of Le Mans teams
Automotive companies of England